In Your Own Time is the second solo studio album by British singer Mark Owen. The album was released on 3 November 2003, by Island Records. In Your Own Time features a more mature pop rock sound, shifting away from the Britpop sound of his debut album.

Critical reception

The album received mixed to positive reviews. A reviewer from MusicOMH favorably compared the album to the work of folk rock musician Jeff Buckley, saying that Owen had been "clearly listening" to his music, and that listeners would realise this if they would remove their preconceptions about Owen.

Commercial performance
The album failed to match the success of his debut album, where it did not chart anywhere outside of the United Kingdom. The album peaked at number 59 on the UK Albums Chart, and stayed in the charts for only one week, with sales of 17,805 copies sold in the UK. In Scotland, the album charted at number 46.

Singles
"Four Minute Warning" was released as the album's lead single on August 4, 2003. The song was written by Owen and Eliot Kennedy and produced by Henry Priestman. The song peaked at number 4 on the UK Singles Chart, making it his third UK top-ten single, with sales of over 80,000 copies sold in the United Kingdom. The song also reached number 37 in Ireland and number 52 in the Netherlands. Owen performed the song live on several shows, including Top of the Pops, CD:UK and The Graham Norton Show.

"Alone Without You" was released as the album's second single in October 27, 2003. The song charted at number 26 on the UK Singles Chart. Owen performed the song live on Top of the Pops and Today with Des and Mel.

Track listing

Personnel

Jon Marius Aareskjold – Engineer, Mixing
Robbie Adams – Engineer, Mixing
Gary Barlow – Composer, Instrumentation, Keyboards
Andy Caine – Background vocals
Ryan Carline – assistant
Alison Clark – Background vocals
Gary Clark – Drum Programming, Engineer, guitar (acoustic), guitar (Bass), guitar (Electric), Harmonica, Instrumentation, Mixing, Producer, Synthesizer Programming, Tambourine, Background vocals
Thymann Dansk – Photography
Hugo Degenhardt – Drums
Geoff Dugmore – Drums
Richard Edgeler – assistant
James Eller – Bass
Tom Elmhirst – Mixing
Mark Tufty Evans – engineer, guitar, Mixing, Programming
Mark Feltham – Harmonica
Ben Georgiades – Engineer
Pete Gleadall – Mixing
Ricky Graham – Engineer
Simon Hale – String arrangements
Robert Harris – Composer
Dave James – Engineer, Producer
Eliot Kennedy – Composer, guitar, Instrumentation
The London Session Orchestra – Orchestra
Ian McCulloch – Composer, guitar
Robbie McKintosh – guitar
John McLaughlin – Composer, Producer
Yoad Nevo – Programming
Matthew Ollivier – Engineer
Mark Owen – Composer, guitar (Electric), Vocals, Background vocals
Henry Priestman – Composer, Producer
Steve Robson – Bass, Composer, guitar, Keyboards, Mixing, Producer
Jonn Savannah – guitar (Electric), Synthesizer, Background vocals
Rohan Thomas – Keyboards
Ali Thomson – Composer, Engineer, Keyboards, Mixing, Producer, Programming, Background vocals
Keith Uddin – assistant
Peter-John Vettese – Composer, Drums, guitar, Keyboards, Producer, Programming, String arrangements
Jeremy Wheatley – Mixing, Programming
Tim Woodcock – Composer
Gavyn Wright – Orchestra Leader

Chart performance

References

External links

2003 albums
Mark Owen albums
Pop rock albums by English artists
Island Records albums